Model Behaviour is a British television reality show which aired on Channel 4 in 2001 and 2002. The show featured a search for a new model with the winner securing a year's contract with a top model agency. The programme was produced by Princess Productions and was similar in format to ITV's Popstars in that it followed the fortunes of several individuals as they lived together and competed for the top prize. The first series followed five women who had been picked from thousands of applicants. The second series followed both male and female potential models. The 2001 series was won by Jenny Richards, a young mother from South Wales who won a year's contract with the Premier agency. and went on to have a successful career as a catwalk model. The 2002 winners were South African Nathan Roberts, and Camilla Priest from Sunderland, who both won a year's contract with Select.

References

2001 British television series debuts
2002 British television series endings
2000s British reality television series
Channel 4 original programming